John D. Davies (December 1795 – 21 October 1861) was a Welsh priest. He was born in Llanddewi-Brefi, and attended school in Lampeter, before moving to study at Queens' College, Cambridge, in 1820.
Following his ordination into the Church of England in Norwich, he became rector of St. Pancras, Chichester. In 1840 he moved to Gateshead, Durham, before in 1853 becoming Honorary Canon of Durham Cathedral. He remained there until retirement in 1860.

He died in 1861 at Ilkley Wells, Yorkshire, aged 65. His daughter, Sarah Emily Davies (1830-1921), born while the family was resident in Southampton, was a pioneer of women's education and co-founder of Girton College, Cambridge. His son John Llewelyn Davies was a prominent theologian and Christian socialist.

The best-known of his written works include; 'The Estimate of the Human Mind' (1828) (2nd ed., 1847), 'Essay on the Old and New Testaments' (1843), and 'The Ordinances of Religion'.

References 

1795 births
1861 deaths
19th-century Welsh Anglican priests
Alumni of Queens' College, Cambridge
18th-century Anglican theologians
19th-century Anglican theologians